Cornelia "Corrie" Johanna Pabst (1865-1943) was a Dutch artist.

Biography 
Pabst was born on 12 November 1865 in Woerden. She studied at the Akademie van beeldende kunsten (Den Haag) (Royal Academy of Art, The Hague). She was a student of Henk Bremmer.  Her work was included in the 1939 exhibition and sale Onze Kunst van Heden (Our Art of Today) at the Rijksmuseum in Amsterdam.

Pabst died on 21 November 1943  in Laren, North Holland. Her work is in the Centraal Museum in Utrecht, the Kröller-Müller Museum, and the Rijksmuseum. In 2022 Pabst has (till 19 February) an exhibition in Het Brinkhuis, Laren.

Gallery

References

External links

1866 births
1943 deaths
20th-century Dutch women artists